Sittaung is a town in Paungbyin Township, Mawlaik District, in the Sagaing Region of Burma (Myanmar) on the right bank of the Chindwin River. There is a highway running west to the Indian border which provides Tamu with access to transport on the Chindwin. This road was laid out in 1887 by troops under Major General John James Hood Gordon to better link Manipur with Upper Burma.

Notes

External links
 "Sittaung Map — Satellite Images of Sittaung" Maplandia

Populated places in Mawlaik District